Armenia has participated in the Eurovision Song Contest 14 times since making its debut in , when André became the first participant representing Armenia and was the first singer from the Caucasus region to compete at Eurovision. Armenia has reached the top 10 on seven occasions, with the country's best result in the contest being two fourth-place finishes, achieved by Sirusho with the song "Qélé, Qélé", and Aram Mp3 with "Not Alone".  was the first year that Armenia failed to advance from the semi-final round. This was followed by the country withdrawing from the  contest due to security concerns in the host city, Baku.

History
In July 2003, private broadcaster Armenia TV claimed to be debuting at the Eurovision Song Contest 2004, despite not being a member of the European Broadcasting Union (EBU), which organises the event. The EBU later denied this claim.

At the time, only the top 10 countries from the previous edition and the "Big Four" were automatically qualified for the final, Armenia had to compete in the semi-final to qualify. André, who was first to perform in the semi-final, reached the final of the contest on 20 May 2006 and gave Armenia a successful debut coming in eighth position.
Having reached the top ten, Armenia did not have to compete in the semi-final in the 2007 contest, where the country achieved another 8th position.

In 2008, Armenia reached the top five for the first time, with Sirusho finishing fourth with the song "Qélé, Qélé", which received the most 12 points in the final, with a total of eight. This result was followed by two more top ten placements in 2009 and 2010, making Armenia, at the time, one of only three countries that had always placed in the top ten since the introduction of the semi-finals. This streak was broken in the 2011 contest, when Emmy and the song "Boom Boom" failed to qualify from the first semi-final by a margin of one point.

On 7 March 2012, Armenia announced that it would withdraw from the 2012 contest, because of security concerns in the host city Baku. Despite their 2012 withdrawal, Armenia confirmed participation in the 2013 contest in Sweden.

In 2014, Armenia matched their highest placement from 2008, with Aram Mp3 and the song "Not Alone" reaching fourth place.  Armenia has reached the final in 11 out of 14 contests, failing to advance to the final for the second time in 2018, finishing 15th in the first semi-final. In 2019, they failed to qualify for a third time, placing 16th in the second semi-final. Armenia had originally planned to participate in the 2021 contest, but later withdrew due to social and political crises in the aftermath of the Second Nagorno-Karabakh War. Armenia returned to the contest in 2022, with Rosa Linn and the song "Snap", qualifying for the first time since 2017.

AMPTV also has a program called Eurovision Diary, which details the experiences of Armenian Eurovision entrants. The program begins every year when the artist is chosen and ends with the Eurovision final.

Participation overview

Awards

Marcel Bezençon Awards

Related involvement

Heads of delegation

Commentators and spokespersons

Other shows

Photogallery

See also

Armenia–Azerbaijan relations in the Eurovision Song Contest
Armenia in the Junior Eurovision Song Contest
Armenia in the Eurovision Young Dancers
Armenia in the Eurovision Young Musicians

Notes

References

External links
OGAE Armenia Official fan club for supporting Armenian representatives at Eurovision Song Contest
Points to and from Armenia eurovisioncovers.co.uk

 
Countries in the Eurovision Song Contest